The Dutch Junior Open squash championship is one of the largest individual junior squash tournaments in the world and is considered one of the most prestigious junior squash championships. It has been running since 1987 every year, and is highly established as it is just one of just five Tier 2 events used in the WSF World Junior Squash Circuit. The tournament hosts over 400 players from more than 30 countries every year and is organized by the Dutch Squash Federation and European Squash Federation (ESF), usually in July. It is a Super Series tournament on the ESF junior circuit, as it attracts top players from all over the world.

The tournament is divided into ten categories — Boys Under-19, Boys Under-17, Boys Under-15, Boys Under-13, Boys Under-11, Girls Under-19, Girls Under-17, Girls Under-15, Girls Under-13, and Girls Under-11.

List of winners by category (Boys) since 2003

Boys' champions by country since 2003

List of winners by category (Girls) since 2003

Girls' champions by country since 2003

See also
 World Junior Squash Circuit
 World Junior Squash Championships
 British Junior Open Squash
 French Junior Open Squash
 Canadian Junior Open Squash
 US Junior Open squash championship
 European Squash Federation
 Dutch Squash Federation

References

Squash tournaments in the Netherlands
Squash records and statistics
Youth sport in the Netherlands
Squash in the Netherlands